Club Deportivo Griñón is a football club based in Griñón, Spain. Founded in 1968, it plays in the Tercera División – Group 5. Its stadium is La Mina with a capacity of 1,000 seats.

Season to season

External links
 Official website

Football clubs in the Community of Madrid
Association football clubs established in 1968
1968 establishments in Spain